The canton of Guilherand-Granges is an administrative division of the Ardèche department in southern France. It was created at the French canton reorganisation which came into effect in March 2015. Its seat is in Guilherand-Granges.

It consists of the following communes:
Châteaubourg
Cornas
Guilherand-Granges
Saint-Péray
Saint-Romain-de-Lerps

References

Cantons of Ardèche